"Half of My Hometown" (stylized in all lowercase letters) is a song recorded by American country music artists Kelsea Ballerini and Kenny Chesney. It was released to country music radio on April 19, 2021, as the fourth single from Ballerini's third studio album Kelsea. Ballerini co-wrote the song with Ross Copperman, Nicolle Galyon, Shane McAnally, and Jimmy Robbins. An alternate recording of the song is also included on Ballerini's first remix album, Ballerini.

The song won both Musical Event of the Year and Video of the Year at the 55th Annual Country Music Association Awards and was nominated for Single of the Year at the 56th CMA Awards.

Content
"Half of My Hometown" describes the conflicting emotions of a person who feels conflict between staying in their hometown, or leaving it in favor of an improvement. Ballerini recorded vocals for this song immediately after writing it and some demo vocals were retained in the final edit. The song makes references to Knoxville, Tennessee - the hometown of both artists - inspiring the decision to enlist Chesney to feature on the track. Chesney says he "couldn't say 'yes' fast enough" after hearing the song.

Critical reception
In a review for Kelsea on AllMusic, Stephen Thomas Erlewine wrote that Chesney's inclusion on the song "seems designed to reinforce [Ballerini's] country roots." Jonathan Bernstein of Rolling Stone labelled the song a "heartwarming acoustic anthem," in his review of Kelsea. Cillea Houghton of Sounds Like Nashville wrote that "the starlet takes on a more serious tone with the observational "half of my hometown"," and called the song "a standout moment" on the album. An unnamed reviewer for Off the Record UK wrote that "the addition of Chesney's distinctive vocal is the masterstroke here to make it the standout track on the record," and adds that "it is both catchy and full of nostalgia."

Music video
The video was directed by Patrick Tracy. It features Kelsea picturing an alternate life where she stayed in Knoxville, Tennessee instead of pursuing her dream as a country star interspersed with clips of her performance of the song with Chesney at the ACM Awards.

Live performances
Ballerini and Chesney performed the song together at the 56th Academy of Country Music Awards on April 18, 2021, one day before releasing the song to radio. The performance served as the single's live debut. Ballerini performed during the live finale part 2 of The Voice season 20, Kenzie Wheeler performed Chesney's vocals of the song.

Accolades

Charts

Weekly charts

Year-end charts

Certifications

References

2020 songs
2021 singles
Kelsea Ballerini songs
Kenny Chesney songs
Black River Entertainment singles
Male–female vocal duets
Songs written by Kelsea Ballerini
Songs written by Ross Copperman
Songs written by Nicolle Galyon
Songs written by Shane McAnally
Songs written by Jimmy Robbins